Philipp Langen (born 2 July 1986 in Lahnstein, West Germany) is a German former footballer.

Career 
The midfielder joined the youth team of TuS Koblenz in the age of 14, playing his first match for the professional team in the German Oberliga Südwest (4th division) aged only 17. After the ascent to Regionalliga in 2004 he immediately became a starter in his team, playing 63 matches and scoring five goals in two seasons, finally celebrating the club's promotion to 2nd Bundesliga for the 2006–07 season. He joined Greuther Fürth in 2008 and turned back for one season on loan to TuS Koblenz on 19 June 2009.

Honours 
 Rheinlandpokal 2005 and 2006 with TuS Koblenz

References

External links 
 

1986 births
Living people
German footballers
TuS Koblenz players
SpVgg Greuther Fürth players
2. Bundesliga players
Association football midfielders